The Battle of Palonegro was a battle in the Santander Department of Colombia, than lasted from May 11—26, 1900, in the early days of the Thousand Days War. The commanding general of the Liberal armies, Gabriel Vargas Santos, ordered his troops to retire to Palonegro, near the city of Bucaramanga in the Santander Department of Colombia. After the battle, the war escalated, and became one of the most brutal conflicts in early 20th century South America.

Background
After the Liberal victory in the Battle of Peralonso on December 15, 1899, the Liberals could have chosen to march unopposed on the capital, consolidating the defeat of the Conservatives. General Vargas Santos, commander of the Liberal army, believed it was dishonorable to attack the dispersed government army, and ordered that his troops move to Cúcuta, many kilometers from the site of the battle.

By the time the General decided to recommence the war in February, fighting off mosquitoes and fever, the new Conservative army was fresh and well supplied under the command of the general Próspero Pinzón, and had cut off all routes of escape.

The battle
On May 11, 1900, the Liberal advance arrived at the outposts in the Canta mountains, in between Bucaramanga and Lebrija, beginning the longest battle of the war. Fifteen days of intense combat on a front of 26 kilometers of trenches took place in the hills of Palonegro.

After the battle, the doctors who took care of the wounded and dead recounted stories of the brutality of the battle. Sources put the dead at 2,500, 1,500 Liberals and 1,000 Conservatives. The battle ended on May 26 when the Liberals began to abandon their positions in order to retreat.

Aftermath
General Vargas Santos unexpectedly opted to lead his troops to safety via the jungle of Teorama. From that point on, the war began to escalate, ending with the defeat of the Liberals.

Galery

References

External links
 http://www.presidencia.gov.co (Page contains information on number of participants in battle)
 http://www.colombialink.com (LA BATALLA DE PALONEGRO)

Palonegro
1900 in Colombia